Kuvettu  is a census town in the southern state of Karnataka, India. Administratively it is under Beltangadi taluk of Dakshina Kannada district in Karnataka.

There is one town, Kuvettu, and one village, Odilnala, in the Kuvettu gram panchayat

Demographics
 India census, Kuvettu had a population of 6,035 with 2,955 males and 3,080 females.

 census Kuvettu reported a total of 7,266 inhabitants.

See also
 Mangalore
 Belthangady taluk
 Dakshina Kannada

References

External links
 

Villages in Dakshina Kannada district